Struck by Lightning is an American television sitcom about Frankenstein's monster, which aired on CBS from September 19 until October 3, 1979.

This show was cancelled after three out of 11 episodes were aired in the United States, although all 11 completed episodes did end up being shown in the United Kingdom on ITV in 1980 and six out of the 11 episodes were screened on ATN-7 Sydney in Australia from 26 December 1980 to 1 March 1981.

Premise
Ted Stein (Jeffrey Kramer) is a science teacher who inherits a spooky old New England inn inhabited by its hulking, good-naturedly homicidal caretaker Frank (Jack Elam). It turns out that Ted is the descendant of the original Dr. Frankenstein and Frank is the Monster who needs a special serum every 50 years to stay alive, and he wants Ted to recreate it for him ("If you don't, I'll die," he explains, "Let me put it another way, if you don't, you'll die"). Ted agrees to stay and continue his ancestor's experiments while keeping Frank's identity a secret.

Cast
Jack Elam as Frank
Jeffrey Kramer as Ted Stein
Millie Slavin as Nora
Bill Erwin as Glenn Diamond
Jeff Colter as Brian
Richard Stahl as Walt Calvin

Episode list
11 episodes were made, but only the first three were aired in America.

Production
Elam claimed in an interview in Variety that he accepted the role of Frank after being told by the producers that he would not have to wear monster make-up because his naturally gnarled and bulgy-eyed appearance was already perfect for the part.

Availability
As of 2010, Struck by Lightning had not been released on home video.

See also
 Frankenstein; or, The Modern Prometheus, 1818 novel by Mary Shelley

References
 

1979 American television series debuts
1979 American television series endings
1970s American sitcoms
CBS original programming
English-language television shows
Television series by CBS Studios
Works based on Frankenstein
Television shows set in Maine